Butcher Ridge is a large, mainly ice-free ridge near the polar plateau in the west part of the Cook Mountains. The ridge is in the form of an arc, extending northwest from Mount Ayres. The Ridge peaks at 2,003 meters (6,572 feet). It was named by the Advisory Committee on Antarctic Names for Commander H.K. Butcher, U.S. Navy, air operations officer on the Staff of the U.S. Naval Support Force, Antarctica, during U.S. Navy Operation Deepfreeze 1963 and 1964.

See also
McCafferty Spur, on the north face of Butcher Ridge

References

External links
 

Ridges of Oates Land